is a Japanese regional bank that is based out of Morioka, the capital of Iwate prefecture in the Tohoku region. The Morioka branch building, the site of the old Morioka Bank, is a historic landmark in the prefecture. The bank has branches in Sendai and Hachinohe; unfavorable business conditions forced the bank to close a branch in Sapporo.

History
The bank was created from capital from Iwate prefecture in the wake of a 1932 banking crisis that affected other regional banks, including the Morioka Bank.  Originally established as the Iwate Shokusan Bank, the bank changed its name to its current form in 1960.

During the bubble economy era of the late 1980s, the Bank of Iwate was known for its sound lending practices, and as a result, was relatively stable during the period following the collapse of the bubble.  While the bank has dropped in its rankings in recent years, it is said to maintain high standards. The bank has recently diversified, offering insurance and securities services for customers.

Financial issues
The Bank of Iwate faces competition from national banks that are continuing to expand business services in Morioka, including the Bank of Tokyo-Mitsubishi, and the Sumitomo Mitsui Banking Corporation.  One long-term issue that will face Japan's regional banks will be the level of competition from Japan Post, the Japanese postal system which is also the world’s largest savings institution, by assets, when it is privatized in 2007.

External links

  Official site
  English part of official site
  Google Finance
  Hoovers Report
  Wiki collection of bibliographic works on Bank of Iwate

Regional banks of Japan
Companies based in Iwate Prefecture
Morioka, Iwate
Companies listed on the Tokyo Stock Exchange
Banks established in 1932
1932 establishments in Japan